Opontia is an e-commerce company founded in February 2021 by Philip Johnston and Manfred Meyer.

History
Opontia was co-founded by Manfred Meyer who was previously the CEO of Next Commerce, Chief Commercial Officer of Digikala in Iran, and Chief Marketplace Officer of Lazada. Philip Johnston was working in investment banking in Singapore and venture capital in Africa before joining McKinsey & Company in Dubai as a consultant working on M&A and e-commerce strategy.

In June 2021, Opontia raised  million in seed round from Global Founders Capital, Presight Capital, Raed Ventures and Kingsway Capital. The company announced plans for brands in Egyptian, Turkish and Nigerian markets.

In July 2021, Opontia acquired 100% of Novimed, a UAE company that produces consumer medical products.

In August 2021, Opontia opened a new office in Turkey, then another office in October 2021 in Poland.

In December 2021, Opontia raised  million in equity and venture debt in a series A round, making it the only newcomer in 2021 to be featured in the Forbes Middle East's 50 Most-Funded Startups being ranked 12th.

Opontia buys and grows e-commerce brands in the CEEMEA (Central & Eastern Europe, the Middle East, and Africa). It is considered one of the first companies in the Middle East to raise venture debt.

By the end of 2021 it had signed term sheets with 15 brands and concluded a partnership with Aramex.

See also
 Amazon Marketplace
 Procter & Gamble
 Unilever

References

External links
 
 
 
 Opontia at CB Insights

Companies based in Dubai
Retail companies established in 2021